Paracyclotosaurus (meaning "Near Wheeled Lizard") is an extinct genus of temnospondyl amphibian, which would have appeared similar to today's salamander – but much larger, measuring up to  long and weighing between . It lived in the Middle Triassic period, about 235 million years ago, and fossils have been found in Australia, India, and South Africa.

Although they could live on dry land, Paracyclotosaurus probably spent most of its time in water.

Discovery and naming

The type species P. davidi is only known from one complete specimen recovered from Australia. It was discovered by quarry miners in a brick pit in St. Peters in Sydney, New South Wales. The discovery, made in 1910, was from a large ironstone nodule within Ashfield Shale which contained the nearly complete skeleton. The reconstruction was finished in July 1914, and was initially determined to be closely related to Cyclotosaurus. The original bone of the P. davidi holotype specimen was in very bad condition, but after the bone was removed from the hard ironstone matrix, casts were made from the matrix mold, and a mold was made from those casts. Casts of the original bone show a fair amount of detail.

Paracyclotosaurus davidii was named after Sir Edgeworth David, the man who arranged for the British Museum (Natural History) to acquire the specimen.

References

 Patricia Vickers-Rich and Thomas Hewett Rich 1993, Wildlife of Gondwana,  Reed.

External links
The Paleobiology Database: Paracyclotosaurus
Paracyclotosaurus davidi at the Natural History Museum

Triassic temnospondyls of Asia
Triassic temnospondyls of Africa
Triassic temnospondyls of Australia
Prehistoric vertebrates of Oceania
Prehistoric tetrapod genera
Fossil taxa described in 1958
Prehistoric amphibian genera